In the Schism  of Montaner between 1967 and 1969, almost all residents of the Italian village of  renounced Catholicism and embraced the Eastern Orthodoxy. This was due to a disagreement with the bishop of Vittorio Veneto, Albino Luciani, the future Pope John Paul I, over the appointment of the local priest.

Montaner frazione 
Montaner or Montanèr is a frazione of the commune of Sarmede, in the province of Treviso, in the region of Veneto. It is 2.3 km from the municipality of Sarmede, to which it belongs.

Background 
On December 13, 1966, Giuseppe Faè, the parish priest, died. Faè, who had served the community for forty years, had proven popular with the people of Montaner. He aided in obtaining electricity and running water for the village, the construction of a new school, and even aided in the organization of anti-fascist resistance to the German occupation. After his death, the bishop of Vittorio Veneto decided to appoint Giovanni Gava as the new priest, which was unpopular among the villagers. They instead supported Antonio Botteon, who, for a long time, had assisted the old priest.

On January 21, 1967, the new priest arrived in town; however, the night before his arrival, the townspeople erected a wall blocking the entrance of the church and a mob of townspeople prevented him from carrying out his work.

Schism 

The people then founded the Eastern Orthodox Church of Montaner. On December 26, 1967, the first Divine Liturgy was celebrated with the Eastern Orthodox Byzantine rite. The Eastern Orthodox priest, Claudio Vettorazzo, was permanently installed in June 1969 and on September 7, 1969, the Eastern Orthodox church was blessed. Residents of the village recall that the initial time period after the schism resulted in "hatred" and "confusion" within the village.

In 1994, Vettorazzo was imprisoned because of legal and financial problems.

Today, the Catholic and Eastern Orthodox communities still exist within the village, though divisions remain.

See also
Schism
Old and New Light

References

Further reading
  Valentina Ciciliot, Il caso Montaner. Un conflitto politico tra chiesa cattolica e chiesa ortodossa, Venezia - Ca' Foscari, 2004.

External links
 The schisme of Montaner in Youtube 
 Reportage of TV  RAI about Montaner 

Schisms from the Catholic Church
Eastern Orthodoxy in Italy
Veneto
1960s in Italy
1967 in Christianity